Genesis Live 1973–2007 is a box set by Genesis which includes all of their live albums except Live over Europe 2007. Genesis Live and its bonus tracks, Seconds Out, and Live at the Rainbow 1973 all include bonus DVDs which feature their respective albums in 5.1 Surround Sound. Three Sides Live and The Way We Walk are included on stereo CDs only. Unlike previous Genesis box sets, this box set does not have any version which includes SACDs. Although Live Over Europe 2007 was originally slated for inclusion, producer Nick Davis persuaded the band's management to exclude the album from the box set after hearing from a number of fans that they preferred not to buy the album again so soon after its original 2007 release.

Unlike the three studio albums box sets, the remixed live albums have generally not been released as standalone CDs.

Track listing

Genesis Live (CD/DVD)

Recorded 1973

Recorded 1975

Seconds Out (2 CDs/1 DVD)

Recorded 1977, except where noted.

Disc 1

Disc 2

Three Sides Live (2 CDs)

Recorded 1981, except where noted.

Disc 1

Disc 2

The Way We Walk (2 CDs)

Recorded 1992, except where noted.

Disc 1

Disc 2

Live at the Rainbow (CD/DVD)

Recorded 1973

Download-only / DVD bonus audio tracks

The bonus tracks were briefly available to download for Genesis-Music.com Fan Club members in WAV and MP3 and also appear, with the CD tracks, on the DVD. The DVD starts with Watcher of the Skies and The Musical Box is placed between Firth of Fifth and More Fool Me.

Empty Slot for Live over Europe 2007 (2 CDs/2 DVDs)

Recorded in 2007, Live over Europe 2007 is not included in the set but an empty slot has been provided for it to be placed in. The track listing is as follows:

Disc 1

Disc 2

References

Notes

Genesis (band) compilation albums
Genesis (band) live albums
2009 live albums
2009 compilation albums